Incontinentia pigmenti achromians (also known as "hypomelanosis of Ito") is a cutaneous condition characterized by various patterns of bilateral or unilateral hypopigmentation following the lines of Blaschko. Though the consistency of the skin findings have led to the term "hypomelanosis of Ito", it actually refers to a group of disorders with various genetic causes including polyploidies and aneuploidies. Based upon the specifics of the genetic defect, the skin findings can be accompanied by a great range of systemic findings. These include central nervous system, ocular, and musculoskeletal defects. Nonetheless, the vast majority of cases are limited to the skin. As opposed to incontinentia pigmenti, hypomelanosis of Ito affects both genders equally. This disorder was first described by Japanese dermatologist Minor Ito in 1952.

See also 
 List of dental abnormalities associated with cutaneous conditions
 Incontinentia pigmenti
 List of cutaneous conditions

References

External links 

Genodermatoses
Genetic disorders with OMIM but no gene